Asherville is an unincorporated community in Jackson Township, Clay County, Indiana. It is part of the Terre Haute Metropolitan Statistical Area.

History
John Asher laid out Asherville in 1873. At the same time, a post office was built and remained in operation until its discontinuation in 1912.

Geography

References

Unincorporated communities in Clay County, Indiana
Unincorporated communities in Indiana
Terre Haute metropolitan area